Evdokia Tetzalidou  (born 21 February 1990) is a Greek female retired water polo player, who played as a centre back for Olympiacos and Ethnikos in Greece. As a player of Olympiacos, Tetzalidou won the 2014–15 LEN Euro League Women, the 2015 Women's LEN Super Cup and the 2014 Women's LEN Trophy. She's also won the 2010 Women's LEN Trophy with Ethnikos.

References

1990 births
Living people
Greek female water polo players
Olympiacos Women's Water Polo Team players
Place of birth missing (living people)

Ethnikos Piraeus Water Polo Club players
Water polo players from Piraeus
21st-century Greek women